Dennis "Danny" de Munk (born 19 February 1970 in Amsterdam) is a Dutch actor, singer, musical actor and former child star.

Career
De Munk started acting at the age of 13 as the leading role in the film Ciske de Rat (Ciske the Rat), directed by Guido Pieters, starring Herman van Veen as teacher and Willeke van Ammelrooy as mother. The coming of age trilogy (book) was written by Piet Bakker from 1941 to 1946.

The title song of the film Ik voel me zo verdomd alleen was also sung by Danny de Munk and in 1984 scored a number one hit in the Dutch Top 40 and stayed there for 14 weeks (3 weeks number one).

Between 1986 and 1991 he had successfully continued acting and singing, but started 1991 a career as musical actor. In 1995 Danny de Munk covered Thomas Anders' (of Modern Talking fame) song How Deep Is Your Love for the album Danny. In 1997 he played a homosexual in a soccer team in the film All Stars. He is still singing and has an own stage program.

In September 2018, Danny released his single Toch ff Lekker Zo.

Personal life
De Munk has been married since 1998 and has a daughter and a son.

On 25 April 2008 Danny de Munk was made a knight of the Order of Orange-Nassau.

Discography

Albums
1985: Danny de Munk
1987: 'N Jaar Later
1989: Geen Wereld Zonder Jou
1995: Danny
2007: Hart en Ziel
2010: Dit is mijn leven

Singles
1984: "Ik voel me zo verdomd alleen..."
1984: "Mijn stad"
1985: "Mijn meissie"
1985: "Mengelmoes"
1985: "Met Kerstmis hoor je blij te zijn"
1986: "Ratsmodee"
1987: "Amsterdam laat je niet kisten"
1987: "Als jij maar bij me bent"
1989: "Twee lege handen"
1991: "Vrienden voor het leven"
1992: "Onbeschrijfelijk mooi"
2008: "Het levende bewijs"
2008: "Laat ons niet alleen" (with Dave)
2009: "Bloemetje"
2010: "Dit is mijn leven"
2010: "Kontje"
2012: "We brullen voor oranje" (feat DJ Galaga)
2013: "Tuig van de richel"
2014: "De beuk erin oranje" (Danny de Munk vs. Tony Star)
2014: "Ze wacht nog steeds op mij"
2018: "Toch ff Lekker Zo"

Featured in
2013: "Zo verdomd alleen" (Lil' Kleine feat. Danny de Munk)

Collective
1987: "S.O.S. Mozambique" (Dutch Artists Sing For Mozambique)

Film and television
1984: Ciske de Rat (soundtrack)
1994: "Vrienden voor het Leven" (theme song for a Dutch sitcom)

Filmography 
1984: Ciske de Rat
1985: Danny Dubbel (television documentary, featuring Ciske and Danny, performing songs from his first record)
1986: Op hoop van zegen, also the song "Ratsmodee"
1988: De Vuurdoop
1993: Vrouwenvleugel (TV series)
1997: All Stars
2011: Old Stars

Musical
 Ciske de Rat (musical, 2009)

Selected musicals
Les Misérables (musical, as Marius, 1991)
Cyrano: The Musical
Tsjechov (musical)
Pump boys and dinettes (musical)
Elisabeth (musical)
De Tijdaffaire (musical for Rabobank)
Copacabana (musical)
De Jantjes (musical)
The Lion King
The Wiz (musical)
Ciske de Rat (musical, as grown-up Ciske, 2007–2009)

References

Bibliography
 Holmstrom, John. The Moving Picture Boy: An International Encyclopaedia from 1895 to 1995. Norwich, Michael Russell, 1996, p. 378.

External links 

Danny de Munk  – official website
Danny de Munk at The Boy Choir & Soloist Directory

Dutch levenslied singers
Dutch male film actors
Dutch male musical theatre actors
1970 births
Living people
Dutch child singers
Dutch male child actors
Male actors from Amsterdam
21st-century Dutch male actors
20th-century Dutch male singers
21st-century Dutch male singers
21st-century Dutch singers